Saafi may refer to:

Saafi Brothers - psychedelic trance music project from Germany
Saafi language -language of Senegal